Malcolm X: Make It Plain is a 1994, English language documentary by PBS about the life of Malcolm X, or El-Hajj Malik El-Shabazz.

The documentary was narrated by Alfre Woodard, produced and directed by Orlando Bagwell, written by Steve Fayer and Orlando Bagwell and co-produced by Judy Richardson. Executive producer was Henry Hampton and it was shown on season 6 of American Experience.

The documentary has been screened on the BBC, History Channel, Discovery Channel, Biography and PBS.

Interviewees include Ossie Davis, Alex Haley, Betty Shabazz and Wallace D. Muhammad, among others.

See also
The Autobiography of Malcolm X

References

External links
Official website
 

1994 films
American documentary films
American Experience
Films about Malcolm X
1990s English-language films
1990s American films